Wasteland is a 1960 French Drama film directed by Marcel Carné and starring Danielle Gaubert and Maurice Caffarelli. The story is loosely based on the novel Tomboy by Hal Ellson.

Plot
Around a newly built HLM stretch wasteland and brownfield providing refuge to young people fleeing the unfathomable tedium of family life in the Paris suburbs. They share their secrets, the products of their thefts, submit to strict rituals. The sanctity of their revolt is highlighted by the initiation by jumping blindfolded and blood rite of passage. Dan, a beautiful young tomboy, rules the clan.

But the gang threatens increasingly sliding into serious crime, which is condemned by Dan and Lucky, a big brawler boy but who begins to consider an orderly life. Now they are ostracized along with the young Babar, accused of being a stool pigeon. Lucky, on the run, and Dan discover a mutual romantic inclination, while Babar, cruelly mistreated and humiliated, commits suicide.

Cast
Danielle Gaubert as Dan
Roland Lesaffre as Big Chief
Maurice Caffarelli as Lucky
Constantin Andrieu as Marcel
Jean-Louis Bras as Babar
Dominique Dieudonné as Le râleur
Denise Vernac as Marcel's mother
François Nocher
Alfonso Mathis as Hans
Pierre Richard
Georges Wilson as His Honour J. Royer the juvenile judge
Dominique Davray as Dan's mother
Simone Berthier as Babar's mother
Pierre Collet as Lucky's father
Claudine Auger as Prisunic' saleswoman shouting stop thief
Dominique Lépinay
Pierre Parel
Anne Béranger
Gib Grossac as The show announcer at the fair
Georgette Peyron
Jacques Berger
Jacques Galland as Prisunic's manager
Jacques Mancier as Babar's father
Charles Bayard as An onlooker at Prisunic
Louisette Rousseau as A woman at Prisunic

External links
 

Films directed by Marcel Carné
1960 films
French black-and-white films
1960s French-language films
French drama films
1960s teen drama films
Films set in Paris
1960 drama films
1960s French films